Long Binh Depot (Vietnamese: Depot Long Bình) is a train depot located in Thu Duc, Ho Chi Minh City, Vietnam. The  depot serves as the control center and maintenance yard for Line 1 of the Ho Chi Minh City Metro.

References 

Transport in Ho Chi Minh City
Public transport in Ho Chi Minh City
Rapid transit in Vietnam